Buti is a comune (municipality) in the Province of Pisa in the Italian region Tuscany, located about  west of Florence and about  east of Pisa.

Geography
Buti borders the following municipalities: Bientina, Calci, Capannori, Vicopisano.

Government

Frazioni 
The municipality is formed by the municipal seat of Buti and the villages (frazioni) of Cascine di Buti and La Croce.

2021 municipal election
The 2021 municipal election attracted press coverage ("Election in Buti – the candidates are named Buti and Buti" in il Fatto Quotidiano) when Arianna Buti defeated Monia Buti in the election for mayor.

Main sights
 Tonini Castle
 Medici Villa
 Fortified burgh of Castel di Nocco
 Church of St. Francis

References

External links

 Official website

Cities and towns in Tuscany
Castles in Italy